Charles Habib Ayrout (Arabic: شارل حبيب عيروط-) (1905 Cairo, Egypt - 1965 Cairo, Egypt) was an architect practising in Cairo and is considered one of that city's 'pioneer' generation, as well as a Belle Epoque/Art Déco (1920–1940) architect for his landmark buildings and villas,. and was one of the most active builders in its Heliopolis district. He summarised his approach in 1932 as to “bring to Heliopolis the principles of modern architecture, but not of avantgarde architecture."

Family
His father, Habib Ayrout, was a Syro-Lebanese Egyptian architect and contractor practicing in Cairo. After being educated in Paris as an engineer-architect, Habib Ayrout participated in the planning and construction of Heliopolis.

Charles Ayrout had two brothers, the Jesuit priest Henry Habib Ayrout and Max Ayrout, who was also an architect practicing in Cairo.

Style
Ayrout was part of a movement of French educated Syrio-Lebanese Egyptian architects, who were strongly influenced by the French 'modern classicism' of Michel Poux-Spitz and Pol Abraham. This movement also included Antonine Selim Nahas and Raymond Antonious. However, he stressed on learning the principles of Modrnist architecture, and reapplying them in Egypt as opposed to copying them.

Works in Cairo include

Bldg, 26 July/Hassan Sabri, Zamalek
25 Mansour Street, Bab al-Louk
Ayrout Bldg, Cherif Pasha Street
Bldg Shawarby Street
Ayrout Villa, Zamalek
Mosseri Building (now Mofti) on Shagaret Al Durr St., Zamalek
Bishara Bldg, Nile Avenue
Halim Doss Bldg, Midan Shafakhana
Ibrahimieh Secondary School, Garden City
Kahil Bldg, Kantaret al-Dikka
Bldg Gamal el Dine Abou El Mahassen, Garden City (1951)
Villa Valadji, Heliopolis

See also

 List of Egyptian architects

 Heliopolis (Cairo Suburb)
 Heliopolis style

References

Further reading
Studies where Ayrout's work is discussed:
 L’identification d’un ensemble urbain du XXème siècle en Egypte: Héliopolis, Le Caire. by Mercedes Volait and Claudine Piaton.
 L'inscription du discours occidental dans l'architecture et l'urbanisme orientaux by M Zakarya.
 Jaroslaw Dobrowolski and Agnieszka Dobrowolska, Heliopolis: Rebirth of the City of the Sun, American University in Cairo Press, 2006.
 Le rêve fou d’un baron belge by Nabila Massrali and Amira Doss. Al-Ahram Hebdo, 27 April 2005, Issue No. 555.
 "A Change in Looking" (on Bauhaus style) by Sonali Pahwa. Al-Ahram Weekly, 22–28 April 2004, Issue No. 687.

On the Belle Époque architecture in Cairo:
 Cynthia Myntti, Paris Along the Nile: Architecture in Cairo from the Belle Epoque, American University in Cairo Press, 2003.
 Trevor Mostyn, Egypt's Belle Epoque: Cairo and the Age of the Hedonists, Tauris Parke Paperbacks, 2006.
 A list of Cairo's Belle Époque architects 1900 - 1950, compiled by Samir Raafat.

Egyptian architects
Egyptian people of Lebanese descent
Year of death missing
Year of birth missing
Levantine-Egyptians
Belle Époque